This is an article about qualification for the 2016 Women's U19 Volleyball European Championship.

Qualification summary

Pool standing procedure
 Number of matches won
 Match points
 Sets ratio
 Points ratio
 Result of the last match between the tied teams

Match won 3–0 or 3–1: 3 match points for the winner, 0 match points for the loser
Match won 3–2: 2 match points for the winner, 1 match point for the loser

Direct qualification

First round
First round was held 7–10 January 2016. 6 teams competed in 2 first round tournaments consisting of 3 teams. The winners of each pools qualified for the second round.
Pools composition

All times are local.

Pool 1
Venue:  Palace of Youth and Sports, Pristina, Kosovo

|}

|}

Pool 2
Venue:  New Volleyball Arena, Tbilisi, Georgia

|}

|}

Second round
Second round was held 31 March – 3 April 2016. 28 teams competed in 7 pools of 4 teams. The winners of each pools qualified for final round. The 2nd placed teams of each pool and the best 3rd placed team qualified for the third round.
Pools composition

All times are local.

Pool A
Venue:  Sportska Hala Vlade Divac, Vrnjačka Banja, Serbia

|}

|}

Pool B
Venue:  Dvorana Gimnasium, Rovinj, Croatia

|}

|}

Pool C
Venue:  Pala Dennerlein, Naples, Italy

|}

|}

Pool D
Venue:  Borisoglebskiy Sport Hall, Ramenskoye, Russia

|}

|}

Pool E
Venue:  Hristo Botev, Sofia, Bulgaria

|}

|}

Pool F
Venue:  Riga 49 School Sport Complex, Riga, Latvia

|}

|}

Pool G
Venue:  Stadionhal 1, Brøndby, Denmark

|}

|}

Ranking of the third placed teams

|}

Third round
Third round will be held 7–10 July 2016. 8 teams will compete in 2 pools of 4 teams. The winners of each pools and the best runners-up will qualify for the final round.

Pools composition

All times are local.

Pool H
Venue:  Sportska Hala Vlade Divac, Vrnjačka Banja, Serbia

|}

|}

Pool I
Venue:  Olympic Sports Centre, Riga, Latvia

|}

|}

Ranking of the second placed teams

|}

References

External links
Official website

Women's Junior European Volleyball Championship
European Championship U19
2016 in youth sport